The women's team recurve competition at the 2022 European Archery Championships took place from 6 to 12 June in Munich, Germany.

Qualification round
Results after 216 arrows.

Elimination round
Source:

Section 1

Section 2

Final round

References

Women's Team Recurve
2022 in women's archery